The Victoria Cross (VC) is a naval and military decoration awarded for valour "in the face of the enemy" to members of armed forces of some Commonwealth countries and previous British Empire territories. It takes precedence over all other postnominals and medals. It may be awarded to a person of any rank in any service and civilians under military command, and is presented to the recipient by the British monarch during an investiture held at Buckingham Palace. It is the joint highest award for bravery in the United Kingdom with the George Cross, which is the equivalent honour for valour not "in the face of the enemy." The VC has been awarded on 1356 occasions to 1353 individual recipients.

The VC was introduced on 29 January 1856 by Queen Victoria to reward acts of valour during the Crimean War. The traditional explanation of the source of the gunmetal from which the medals are struck is that it derives from Russian cannon captured at the siege of Sevastopol. Recent research has thrown doubt on this story, suggesting a variety of origins. The original Royal Warrant did not contain a specific clause regarding posthumous awards, although official policy was to not award the VC posthumously. Between 1897 and 1901, several notices were issued in the London Gazette regarding soldiers who would have been awarded the VC had they survived. In a partial reversal of policy in 1902, six of the soldiers mentioned were granted the VC, but not "officially" awarded the medal. In 1907, the posthumous policy was completely reversed and medals were sent to the next of kin of the six officers and men. The Victoria Cross warrant was not officially amended to explicitly allow posthumous awards until 1920 but one quarter of all awards for the First World War were posthumous.

Within this list, the date of action listed is the year in which the action took place for which the VC was awarded. The most naval Victoria Crosses awarded in a single conflict were for the First World War, followed by the Second World War and then the Crimean War. There have been a total of 117 recipients of the Victoria Cross who served with the Royal Navy. Sixty-eight awards were to ship-based Royal Navy personnel, with 49 given to those who served with other organisations within the British naval service, such as the Royal Naval Brigade and the Royal Marines. The Royal Marines have received 10 Victoria Crosses, the Royal Naval Reserve and Volunteer Reserve being awarded 22 VCs. Richard Bell-Davies of the Royal Naval Air Service also received an award.  Note: this list does not include naval awards of the VC to persons serving in navies other than the British, i.e. Lieut. R.H. ("Hammy") Gray, VC, DSC, Royal Canadian Naval Volunteer Reserve.

Recipients

Notes

References 
 
 
 
 

 *
Navy
History of the Royal Navy
Royal Navy lists